JLG Industries, Inc., an Oshkosh Corporation company, is an American designer, manufacturer and marketer of access equipment (aerial work platforms and telehandlers). The company's products are used in construction, fit-outs, industrial maintenance, material handling and facilities maintenance.  Founded in 1969, JLG operated independently until 2006 when it was acquired by Oshkosh Corporation.  JLG operates globally and is headquartered in McConnellsburg, Pennsylvania, United States.  The company celebrated its 50th anniversary in 2019.

History
Founded in 1969, John Landis Grove formed a partnership with two close friends and bought a small metal fabrication business in McConnellsburg, Pennsylvania. With a crew of 20 workers, they built and sold the first JLG aerial work platform in 1970. Many of the basic design elements of that original lift are still being incorporated into products today.
  
Since becoming part of the Oshkosh Corporation Company in late 2006, JLG has seen three appointed presidents: Craig E. Paylor,  Wilson Jones, and Frank Nerenhausen.

Markets
JLG distributors serve the industrial, commercial, institutional, and construction markets worldwide.

Locations
JLG has five manufacturing facilities in the United States in addition to five worldwide, one in Leicester in the United Kingdom, one at Fauillet in France, one at Mediaș in Romania, one at Leon in Mexico, and one at Tianjin in China.  The firm has sales and service support across six continents.  This includes Latin America, the United States, Canada, England, Sweden, Spain, Glasgow, Poland, Russia, The Netherlands, Italy, Germany, France, Hong Kong, China, Australia, and New Zealand.

Products

JLG introduced its first scissor lift in 1973, and in 1979, scissor lift production began in JLG's Bedford, Pennsylvania location. The firm's current product line includes the following types of items:
 Mast booms and boom lifts (aerial work platforms)
 Towable & trailer mounted boom lift trucks and telehandlers
 Vertical mast lifts
 Combustion powered scissor lifts
 Personal portable lifts (LiftPod)
 Low Level Access (Peco and Ecolift, Nano and Power Tower, as added with the purchase of the UK company Power Towers Ltd. in 2015)
 

 
Aerial Work PlatformsElectric boom lifts and Engine-powered boom lifts JLG electric-powered and engine-powered aerial work platforms are designed for a variety of job sites, such as steel mills and chemical plants, airports, convention centers, shipyards and heavy construction. There are models with lift heights ranging from 30 feet to 185 feet, the world's tallest self-propelled aerial work platform. JLG's QuikStik boom design delivers fast cycle speeds of 115 seconds from ground to elevation. In addition, JLG Ultra Series boom lifts come with the only oscillating axle in their boom class, providing enhanced mobility. The Ultra Booms also have a full-time four-wheel drive for reliable traction. In 2011, JLG introduced the 1500SJ, which is the first straight boom lift that takes workers to 150 feet without an oversized load permit (an overweight permit is required for highway transportation). Scissor lifts JLG scissor lifts are available as both electric and engine-powered. The electric-powered scissor lifts can be used both indoors and outside whereas the engine-powered lifts are used exclusively outdoors in rough terrain and applications that require more workspace and lifting capacity.Telehandlers: JLG, Lull and SkyTrak

JLG offers three brands of commercial telescopic handlers: JLG,  SkyTrak and Lull, which feature all-wheel steering, including two-wheel, four-wheel circle and four-wheel crab to meet various maneuverability requirements. Lull telehandlers have a unique precision placement system called a traversing boom. JLG telehandlers have capacities from 5,500 to 17,000 pounds and heights up to 55 feet. The telehandlers come with a wide variety of attachments to assist with challenges on the job site. JLG telehandlers feature Tier 4i and tier 4 final diesel engines, which meet the EPA's Tier 4 emission standards for nonroad diesel engines. These standards allow for a higher level of fuel efficiency and a reduced impact on the environment.

JLG acquired SkyTrak and Lull in 2003. The last Lull-branded telehandlers were offered in 2015 and are no longer made.Military TelehandlersATLAS
ATLAS II
MMVDrop-deck Trailers': (Triple-L trailers)
Utility
Flatbed
Enclosed

  
References

Lute, Gerald. (2006) The Life and Legacy of John L. Grove'' Buchanan Trail Publishing Company.
Grant, James H. (2010), "The Gradall A Story of American Ingenuity", JHG Partners, New Philadelphia, Ohio,

External links 

 JLG Industries, Inc. Official Website
 JLG Distributor (Thailand)

Construction equipment manufacturers of the United States
Oshkosh Corporation